The South Africa national women's cricket team toured England in 1997, playing five women's One Day Internationals.

One Day International series

1st ODI

2nd ODI

3rd ODI

4th ODI

5th ODI

Tour matches

50-over match: South Africa women v England Under-23s women

3-day match: South Africa women v Women's Cricket Association President's XI

References

1997 in English cricket
Women's cricket tours of England
August 1997 sports events in the United Kingdom
England
1999 in English women's sport
1997 in South African women's sport
1997 in women's cricket